Odishi Church of Mother of God is a church in the village of Odishi, Sokhumi municipality, Autonomous Republic of Abkhazia, Georgia.

History 
The church was built in the medieval period. The church walls are in a heavy physical condition and need an urgent conservation.

References 

Religious buildings and structures in Georgia (country)
Religious buildings and structures in Abkhazia
Churches in Abkhazia